Kadalikkattil Mathai Kathanar was the founder of Sacred Heart Congregation. He was born on 25 April 1872 in Palai, Kerala, India. He was a Syro- Malabar Catholic Priest of the Carmelite Congregation. He was Ordained a priest on 17 February 1901. He founded Sacred Heart Congregation on 1 January 1911. He died on 23 May 1935. He was announced 'Servant of God' on 12 November 1989 and raised to the state of 'Venerable' on 27 October 2011 by Pope Benedict XVI.

References 

1872 births
1935 deaths
20th-century venerated Christians
People from Pala, Kerala
Syro-Malabar priests
Venerated Catholics by Pope Benedict XVI